Impatiens frithii is a species of flowering plant in the family Balsaminaceae. It is endemic to Cameroon, where it has been found in the Bakossi Mountains and on Etinde, part of Mount Cameroon. It is an epiphyte growing on small trees and shrubs in elfin forest habitat. It is small and inconspicuous when not bearing its bright red flowers.

Sources

Further reading
Cheek, M. and L. Csiba. (2002). A new epiphytic species of Impatiens (Balsaminaceae) from western Cameroon. Kew Bulletin 57(3) 669–74.

Endemic flora of Cameroon
frithii
Endangered plants
Plants described in 2002
Taxonomy articles created by Polbot
Taxa named by Martin Cheek